Gjorgi Stoilov (born 25 August 1995) is a Macedonian footballer who plays as a midfielder for Zira and the North Macedonia national team.

International career
Stoilov made his international debut for North Macedonia on 13 October 2019 in a UEFA Euro 2020 qualifying match against Poland, which finished as a 0–2 away loss.

Career statistics

International

References

External links
 
 
 
 

1995 births
Living people
Sportspeople from Strumica
Association football midfielders
Macedonian footballers
North Macedonia youth international footballers
North Macedonia under-21 international footballers
North Macedonia international footballers
FK Horizont Turnovo players
Akademija Pandev players
Macedonian First Football League players